Abeer Abdelrahman Khalil Mahmoud (born 13 June 1992) is an Egyptian weightlifter. She was born in Alexandria, Egypt. She competed at the 2008 and 2012 Summer Olympics in the -69 kg and -75 kg weight categories, respectively, and finished in fifth place at both Games. In 2016, Abdelrahman retroactively became the first Egyptian woman to win an Olympic medal when the original gold, silver, and bronze medal winners were disqualified due to doping. Abdelrahman is now the silver medal winner for the 75 kg event in the 2012 Summer Olympics, coming second to Spain's Lidia Velentin. The first Egyptian woman to receive her Olympic medal on the podium was Sara Ahmed for her bronze medal performance in the women's 69 kg at the 2016 Summer Olympics.

References

External links

 
 
 

1992 births
Living people
Olympic weightlifters of Egypt
Weightlifters at the 2008 Summer Olympics
Weightlifters at the 2012 Summer Olympics
Sportspeople from Alexandria
Egyptian female weightlifters
Olympic silver medalists for Egypt
Olympic bronze medalists for Egypt
Olympic medalists in weightlifting
Mediterranean Games gold medalists for Egypt
Mediterranean Games medalists in weightlifting
Competitors at the 2009 Mediterranean Games
Medalists at the 2008 Summer Olympics
Medalists at the 2012 Summer Olympics
World Weightlifting Championships medalists
21st-century Egyptian women